In mathematics, the distortion is a measure of the amount by which a function from the Euclidean plane to itself distorts circles to ellipses.  If the distortion of a function is equal to one, then it is conformal; if the distortion is bounded and the function is a homeomorphism, then it is quasiconformal.  The distortion of a function ƒ of the plane is given by

which is the limiting eccentricity of the ellipse produced by applying ƒ to small circles centered at z.  This geometrical definition is often very difficult to work with, and the necessary analytical features can be extrapolated to the following definition.  A mapping ƒ : Ω → R2 from an open domain in the plane to the plane has finite distortion at a point x ∈ Ω if ƒ is in the Sobolev space W(Ω, R2), the Jacobian determinant J(x,ƒ) is locally integrable and does not change sign in Ω, and there is a measurable function K(x) ≥ 1 such that

almost everywhere.  Here Df is the weak derivative of ƒ, and |Df| is the Hilbert–Schmidt norm.

For functions on a higher-dimensional Euclidean space Rn, there are more measures of distortion because there are more than two principal axes of a symmetric tensor.  The pointwise information is contained in the distortion tensor

The outer distortion KO and inner distortion KI are defined via the Rayleigh quotients

The outer distortion can also be characterized by means of an inequality similar to that given in the two-dimensional case.  If Ω is an open set in Rn, then a function  has finite distortion if its Jacobian is locally integrable and does not change sign, and there is a measurable function KO (the outer distortion) such that

almost everywhere.

See also
 Deformation (mechanics)

References
 .
.

Conformal mappings
Real analysis
Complex analysis
Topology
Measure theory
Euclidean geometry